Osborne is a village community in the central east part of the Riverina.

Gumholes Post Office opened on 1 September 1900, was renamed Osborne in 1902 and closed in 1951.

Sport and Recreation
The Osborne Football Club was first established in 1900 as the Napier South FC. The new community around Gum Holes Creek came together and organised a social game of football against Lockhart. This team was called ‘Napier South’ and were affectionally known as "The Gumholes". The game was played on some cleared land on Fraser's farm near the present day Uniting Church. Even though Napier South only scored one goal, they thought it was a good attempt against a regular team from Lockhart.

In 1915 the Gum Holes School was granted a change in name to Osborne, so when the football club reformed in 1919, after the war, it became Osborne Football Club.

Football Competitions
 Napier South FC (1901–1918)
1901 & 1902: Line Association. Premiers - 1902
1903: Drought. Club in recess.
1904: Milbrulong Football Association. Premiers - 1904
1905–1913: Lockhart Football Association. Premiers - 1905, 1908, 1911.
1906: Greengunyah Football Association
1914–1918: Club in recess due to World War One.
Osborne  FC (1919–2022)
1919–1920: Urageline Football Association. Premiers - 1919
1922: Pleasant Hills & District Football Association. Premiers - 1922
1923–1926: Urageline Football Association. Premiers - 1923, 1924, 1925, 1926. 
1927 & 1928: Osborne & District Football Association. Premiers - 1927. Runners Up - 1928.
1929 - Lockhart & District Lines Football Association. Premiers - 1929
1930–1939: The Rock & District Football Association. Premiers - 1937, 1938 - Drawn grand final, 1938 - Grand final replay
1940: Lockhart & District Football Association. Premiers - 1940.
1941–1944: Club in recess due to World War Two.
1945–1948: Milbrulong & District Football League. Runners Up - 1945, 1946, 1947.
1949–1969: Central Riverina Football League. Premiers - 1950, 1957, 1958, 1961. Runners Up - 1951, 1955.
1970–2022: Hume Football League. Premiers - 1985, 1991, 1992, 1994, 1995, 1998, 1999, 2000, 2001, 2005, 2006, 2009, 2012, 2017, 2019. Runners Up - 1993, 1997, 2002, 2004, 2007, 2008, 2022

Links
Osborne Football / Netball Club
Hume Football League
Australian rules football in New South Wales

Notes and references

Towns in the Riverina
Towns in New South Wales
Australian rules football competitions
Australian rules football competitions in New South Wales
Sport in the Riverina
Sports leagues established in 1900
1900 establishments in Australia